The following is a list of awards and nominations received by American actor Lucas Hedges. He is known for his roles in the films Moonrise Kingdom (2012), Kill the Messenger (2014), and Manchester by the Sea (2016), which earned him many awards and nominations, including an Academy Award for Best Supporting Actor and a Screen Actors Guild Award for Outstanding Performance by a Male Actor in a Supporting Role.

Major Industry Awards

Academy Awards

BAFTA Awards

Golden Globe Awards

Screen Actors Guild Awards

Other Industry Awards

Alliance of Women Film Journalists Awards

Australian Academy of Cinema and Television Arts Awards

Chicago Film Critics Association Awards

Critics' Choice Movie Awards

Dallas–Fort Worth Film Critics Association Awards

Detroit Film Critics Society Awards

Florida Film Critics Circle Awards

Georgia Film Critics Association Awards

Gotham Awards

Houston Film Critics Society Awards

Independent Spirit Awards

Lucille Lortel Awards

National Board of Review Awards

Online Film Critics Society Awards

San Diego Film Critics Society Awards

Satellite Awards

Seattle Film Critics Society Awards

St. Louis Gateway Film Critics Association Awards

Theatre World Awards

Vancouver Film Critics Circle Awards

Washington D.C. Area Film Critics Association Awards

Women Film Critics Circle Awards

Notes

References

External links
 

Hedges, Lucas